Darien Graham Boswell (23 May 1938 – 11 February 2018) was a New Zealand rower.

Boswell was born in Auckland in 1938. At the 1962 British Empire and Commonwealth Games he won the silver medal as part of the men's eight alongside crew members Leslie Arthur, Colin Cordes, Alistair Dryden, Alan Grey, Christian Larsen, Louis Lobel, Robert Page and Alan Webster. After having received an invitation to the Henley Royal Regatta, he won the inaugural Prince Philip Challenge Cup regatta in 1963 in Henley-on-Thames. That year, the Henley regatta was regarded as the event that came closest to a world championship. Dudley Storey, Peter Masfen and Alistair Dryden made up the other rowers, and Bob Page was the cox.

The same coxed four team then went to the 1964 Summer Olympics in Tokyo, where they placed a disappointing eighth. His son, Dane Boswell, has also represented New Zealand in rowing.

Boswell died at Kerikeri on 11 February 2018.

References

1938 births
2018 deaths
Rowers at the 1962 British Empire and Commonwealth Games
Commonwealth Games silver medallists for New Zealand
Rowers at the 1964 Summer Olympics
Olympic rowers of New Zealand
New Zealand male rowers
Rowers from Auckland
Commonwealth Games medallists in rowing
Medallists at the 1962 British Empire and Commonwealth Games